"Poem" is a song by American alternative metal band Taproot and the lead single from their second major label album, Welcome. It was released in 2002 and met with the highest success of any Taproot single, reaching #5 on the Billboard Mainstream Rock Tracks. The track, as well as its music video, were heavily played throughout the several months following its release.

Overview
During the production of Welcome, Taproot had given producer Toby Wright roughly 40 complete songs to which he said were not up to their potential and forced them to start from scratch. However, "Poem" was actually written long before the band started working with Wright. Guitarist Mike DeWolf elaborated:

"That's actually the first song we wrote for the album. . . We played it at the 2001 Ozzfest and there was a big reaction. The kids went nuts for it even more than to our other songs that they'd heard a million times before. In production we changed little things here and there to make it stronger, but it's basically the same song."

"Poem" was performed on the December 13, 2002 edition of Last Call with Carson Daly. The band was late due to weather troubles in Chicago but treated the audience to a half-hour set. A live version of the song was included on the Music as a Weapon II album in 2004.  "Poem" was also featured on the soundtracks for both MVP Baseball 2003 and True Crime: Streets of L.A.

The popular single begins with a few solo guitar chords before breaking into a heavy introduction. The singing style continuously shifts back and forth between harsh and clean vocals, and its chorus lyrics reference the instructions seen on fire alarms ("In case of fire, break the glass and move on into your own").

Music video
Taproot worked with directing team Brothers Strause, whose other work includes Linkin Park and Godsmack, on the music video for "Poem." Shooting took place on August 8 and 9 in Los Angeles with broadcasts beginning in early September 2002. The "Poem" video has Taproot performing inside a crumbling old house. A young man and woman are seen intensely kissing and groping one another amidst the chaotic destruction of the building. Vocalist Stephen Richards unpleasantly bears witness to the couple as he sings, giving the impression of a bitter history between them.

Track listing

The songs "Transparent" and "Free (Succeed)" were recorded during the Welcome sessions but ultimately cut from the album. They were instead included as B-sides to the "Poem" single. "Free (Succeed)"'s lyrics however, still remain on the US pressing of "Welcome."

Charts

Personnel
Stephen Richards – vocals
Mike DeWolf – guitar
Phil Lipscomb – bass guitar
Jarrod Montague – drums
Toby Wright – producer

References

External links
 "Poem" Music Video

2002 singles
2002 songs
Atlantic Records singles
Taproot (band) songs
Songs written by Stephen Richards (musician)